Tough Tenors Again 'n' Again is an album by saxophonists Eddie "Lockjaw" Davis and Johnny Griffin recorded in West Germany in 1970 and released on the MPS label.

Reception

The Allmusic site awarded the album 4 stars stating, "There is no less fire in this reunion, and Boland's arrangements bring out the best in both tenor saxophonists"

Track listing 
All compositions by Edie "Lockjaw" Davis except as indicated
 "Again 'n' Again"  (Eddie "Lockjaw" Davis, Johnny Griffin) - 3:29  
 "Tin Tin Deo"  (Gil Fuller, Chano Pozo) - 10:06  
 "If I Had You"  (Irving King, Ted Shapiro) - 4:20  
 "Jim Dawg" - 8:15  
 "When We Were One" (Griffin) - 7:47  
 "Gigi" - 5:58

Personnel 
Eddie "Lockjaw" Davis, Johnny Griffin - tenor saxophone
 Francy Boland - piano
 Jimmy Woode - bass
 Kenny Clarke - drums

References 

Eddie "Lockjaw" Davis albums
Johnny Griffin albums
1970 albums
MPS Records albums